Sport Victoria was a Peruvian football club representing the city of Ica, Peru. 
The club was founded in 1916 and currently plays in the Peruvian Segunda División which is the second division of the Peruvian league.

History
In 2006 Copa Perú, Sport Victoria classified to the National Stage, but was eliminated by Deportivo Ingeniería in the round of 16.

In 2007 Copa Perú, Sport Victoria classified to the National Stage, but was eliminated by Sport Águila in the round of 16.

In 2010 Copa Perú, Sport Victoria classified to the National Stage, but was eliminated by Asociación Deportiva Tarma in the quarter-finals.

In 2011 Torneo Intermedio, the club was eliminated by Universidad San Martín de Porres in the round of 32*.

In 2011 Copa Perú, Sport Victoria classified to the National Stage, but was eliminated by Alianza Universidad in the round of 16.

In 2012 Copa Perú, Sport Victoria classified to the National Stage, and was invited to play in the 2013 Peruvian Segunda Division

Honours

Regional
Región V: 1
Winners (1):  2006
Runner-up (1): 2007

Región VI: 2
Winners (2): 2010, 2012
Runner-up (1): 2011

Liga Departamental de Ica: 1
Winners (1): 2006
Runner-up (2): 2007, 2010

Liga Distrital de Ica: 2
Winners (2): 2006, 2010

See also
List of football clubs in Peru
Peruvian football league system

External links
Official Web

 
Football clubs in Peru
Association football clubs established in 1916
Sport Victoria